Sirius Disorder was a freeform/eclectic radio station on Sirius Satellite Radio channel 33 and simulcast to Dish Network channel 6033.  Sirius Disorder started on channel 24 then moved to channel 32 on February 14, 2007.  On September 7, 2007, SIRIUS Disorder moved again to Sirius channel 70, replacing the contemporary jazz channel, SIRIUS Planet Jazz.  In addition, The Grateful Dead Channel launched on channel 32 at the time.  On June 24, 2008, Sirius Disorder moved to final channel, 33.  On November 12, 2008, Sirius Disorder was taken off-air as part of the Sirius and XM channel merge, with much of its programming moved to XM's The Loft.

Several of the channel's disc jockeys were veterans of the radio industry, including Michael Tearson of Philadelphia's WDAS-FM, Vin Scelsa and Meg Griffin of New York City's WNEW-FM, as well as musicians David Johansen, Larry Kirwan (of Black 47), and Marky Ramone. Lou Reed began hosting a weekly show, Lou Reed's New York Shuffle, in May 2008. The final concert at the music club CBGB, featuring Patti Smith, was broadcast live on Sirius Disorder on October 15, 2006. High-profile fans of the channel included Emmylou Harris, who said, "They play everything from Louis Prima to Bruce Springsteen to Maria Callas to the Incredible String Band – it's shocking, almost."

See also
 List of Sirius Satellite Radio stations

References 

Defunct radio stations in the United States
Freeform radio stations
Radio stations established in 2002
Radio stations disestablished in 2008